Chorkhamara Dam, is an earthfill dam on Sasanda river near Tiroda, Gondia district in the state of Maharashtra in India.

Specifications

Purpose
 Irrigation

See also
 Dams in Maharashtra
 List of reservoirs and dams in India

References

Dams in Gondia district
Dams completed in 1923
1923 establishments in India